The Near North Side is the eighth of Chicago's 77 community areas. It is the northernmost of the three areas that constitute central Chicago, the others being the Loop and the Near South Side. The community area is located north and east of the Chicago River. To its east is Lake Michigan, and its northern boundary is the early 19th-century city limit of Chicago, North Avenue. In 2020 the Near North Side had 105,481 residents, surpassing Lake View as the largest Chicago community area by population. It is also the most densely populated community area and has the second most skyscrapers, after the Loop. With the exception of Goose Island (which is undergoing development), the Near North Side is known for its extreme affluence, typified by the Gold Coast, Magnificent Mile, Navy Pier, and skyscrapers.

The Near North Side is the oldest part of Chicago. In the 1780s, in what is now the Near North Side, on the northern banks of the Chicago River near today's Michigan Avenue Bridge, Jean Baptiste Point du Sable built the first known permanent settlement in what was called "Eschecagou."  Today, this is marked by Pioneer Court.

Especially in the vicinity of Rush and Erie streets, the Near North Side was once known as McCormickville; so named because it is here where many branches of the famous McCormick family of mechanical reaper fame built their mansions in the late 1800s and early 1900s.

Neighborhoods

Gold Coast

The Gold Coast consists mostly of luxury high-rise apartment towers and buildings and stone mansions throughout. Its borders are generally defined as North Avenue to the north, Lake Michigan to the east, Chicago Avenue to the south, and Clark Street to the west.

The Gold Coast became the home of the super-rich in 1885, when Potter Palmer, former dry goods merchant and owner of the Palmer House hotel, built a fanciful castle on Lake Shore Drive. Over the next few decades, Chicago's elite gradually migrated from Prairie Avenue to their new homes north of the Loop.

Along almost every boulevard of the Gold Coast has upscale boutiques and shops. Giorgio Armani, Barney's, Brioni, Brunello Cucinelli, Bulgari, Tory Burch, Cartier SA, Chanel, Jimmy Choo, Christian Dior, Dolce & Gabbana, Escada, Tom Ford, Gucci, Hermès, Lanvin, Christian Louboutin, Marc Jacobs, Max Mara, Moncler, Prada, Yves Saint Laurent, Paul Stuart, Van Cleef & Arpels, Versace, Louis Vuitton, Vera Wang, and Harry Winston are just a few of the dozens of designers that have locations in the exclusive neighborhood. Also, Aston Martin, BMW, Bentley, Bugatti, Lamborghini, Maserati, Rolls-Royce, and Tesla all have dealerships in the Gold Coast.

Many of Chicago's best known and highly rated restaurants are located here as well. Also in the area are Lou Malnati's Pizzeria, Gibsons Steakhouse, and the original Morton's The Steakhouses.

The "Gold Coast Historic District" was listed on the National Register of Historic Places on January 30, 1978.

The Gold Coast is zoned to the following Chicago Public Schools schools: Ogden School and the prestigious Latin School of Chicago.

Old Town

Old Town is a Chicago neighborhood bounded by North Avenue on the north, Larrabee Street on the northwest, Division Street on the south, Clybourn Avenue on the southwest, and LaSalle Street on the east. It crosses portions of the community areas of southern Lincoln Park, as well as the northern Near North Side, and is part of Chicago's 43rd ward. 
Old Town includes the Old Town Triangle Historic District which is bounded on its northwest side by the former Ogden Avenue right-of-way, its northeast side by Lincoln Avenue and Wells Street, and on its south side by North Avenue. This historic district sits within the Old Town Triangle Association (OTTA), a Lincoln Park neighborhood bounded by the former Ogden Avenue right-of-way, Clark Street, and North Avenue. It sits inside the community area of Lincoln Park and is part of Chicago's 43rd ward. Old Town north of North Avenue is in Lincoln Park, and south of North Avenue is part of the Near North Side. It is now an affluent neighborhood.

Old Town is now an affluent and historic neighborhood, home to many of Chicago's older Victorian-era buildings. However, in the 1950s, most of this area was an enclave to the first emigrants from Puerto Rico to Chicago, who referred to it as part of "La Clark" until commercialization decorated late 1960s shop signs with the name of Old Town. The neighborhood is home to St. Michael's Church, originally built to serve German immigrants, and one of only 7 to survive the great Chicago fire. St. Michael's, Holy Name Cathedral, Immaculate Conception, and St. Joseph's Catholic churches all catered to Latinos with a Mass in Spanish.

Many of the streets and alleys, particularly in the Old Town Triangle section, predate the Great Chicago Fire and do not all adhere to the city's typical grid pattern. In 1927, sculptors Sol Kogen and Edgar Miller purchased and subsequently rehabilitated a house on Burton Place, near Wells Street, into the Carl Street Studios. Through the 1930s, an art colony emerged in the neighborhood as artists moved from the Towertown neighborhood near Washington Square Park.

Old Town was home to many gays and lesbians from the 1950s through the 1980s. This was the first "gay ghetto" in Chicago, predating the current large Lake View neighborhood which also contains the Boystown district. There were numerous gay establishments in Old Town (now mostly closed as Lake View is now the main gayborhood) along Wells Street and Old Town was home to the longstanding gay-themed Bijou Theater until it closed in September 2015. As Old Town gentrified, the LGBT population of the nearby Lake View neighborhood continued to increase, as well as the LGBT populations of the Lincoln Park and Andersonville areas.

Old Town is home to the famous Second City improvisational comedy troupe which has launched the careers of many successful comedians and actors.

Old Town has three "L" rapid transit stations: North/Clybourn, Sedgwick, and Clark/Division.

Goose Island

Goose Island is an island in Chicago covering 160 acres on the Chicago River that is completely surrounded by the rest of the city. It is separated from the mainland by the North Branch of the Chicago River on the west and by the North Branch Canal on the east. The canal was dug in 1853 by mayor William Butler Ogden's administration and was dug for industrial purposes, thus forming the island. After Irish immigrants settled on the island, it took the name Goose Island, as well as that of Kilgubbin, which was the immigrants' original home in Ireland. The Goose Island Brewery makes Kilgubbin Red Ale, in honor of this name.

The large facility on the north end of Goose Island (visible from North Avenue, but by car only reachable from the south: Division Street to North Branch to 1132 W. Blackhawk) is the Wrigley Global Innovation Center, a  facility, which opened in September 2005 and was designed by Gyo Obata of Hellmuth, Obata and Kassabaum. While cars are able to approach from the south, trains, bicycles, and pedestrians can reach the site via the rail/pedestrian Cherry Avenue Bridge spanning from North Avenue to Goose Island. Additionally, there is seasonal access from the north via the Chicago Water Taxi service dock at the south end of the Cherry Avenue Bridge.

On the south end of the island is Kendall College's Riverworks campus. The southern end of the island is currently undergoing redevelopment with upscale condominiums, townhouses, and apartments.

River North

River North is a neighborhood known for its fine dining, galleries, nightlife, and riverwalk amenities. It is home to the world headquarters of ConAgra, Groupon, Motorola Mobility, and the regional offices of Yelp. It is bounded by Michigan Avenue to the east, Chicago Avenue to the north, and the Chicago River to the south and west. River North has many towers and high-rises and some of its other famous structures include the Merchandise Mart, the Wrigley Building, Holy Name Cathedral, the Marina City towers, and the House of Blues.

Smokey Hollow
River North was previously named Smokey Hollow, at the turn of the 20th century, due to the many factories and forges in the area. Smoke from the factories was often so thick that it blocked the sunlight. At the time, Smokey Hollow was a major transportation hub, with railroad tracks linking the ports along the Chicago River to the surrounding areas. The now mixed-use Merchandise Mart was once a major storage warehouse for goods, and it still has railroad tracks underneath its sprawling structure. Former major retailer Montgomery Ward also had a major transportation and storage facility in River North. Massive coal bins were formerly located throughout the neighborhood, for storage of coal transported by ship.

Little Sicily
Little Sicily in Chicago was also located in River North. The first Italian Roman Catholic Church in Chicago was Assumption, on Illinois Street, with a mandate to be the parish church for all Italians from Lake Michigan to the Mississippi River. Later, Sicilians began to move north from the immediate vicinity of Assumption and began to form their own parishes. Italians whose family roots were from other parts of Italy tended to move west along Grand Street and form parishes west of Assumption.

Cabrini–Green

The Near North Side formerly included the now demolished Cabrini–Green public housing project that once housed 15,000 subsidized tenants. It was made up primarily of high-rise and mid-rise buildings. The apartment buildings opened in 1958 and 1962, while the shuttered rowhouses (called the Frances Cabrini Homes, a few of which still exist) had opened in 1942. Cabrini–Green stood in what once was the former Italian enclave called the Little Sicily neighborhood, and the former site of St. Dominic's Church. In the 1920s, Little Sicily developed a reputation for poverty and crime.  As gentrification began to take hold in the 1990s, the buildings made way for new upscale developments. The final Cabrini-Green tower was demolished in 2011. Following the conclusion of a civil lawsuit, the former Cabrini-Green site was transformed and revitalized with new upscale development spurred by the growth of Old Town to the north, and the already upscale/luxurious areas of the Gold Coast to the east and River North to the south. Goose Island, which sits to the west, is currently undergoing new upscale development.

River North
The River North neighborhood got its name from Chicago real estate developer Albert Friedman (chief executive of Friedman Properties Ltd.), who in 1974 started to buy, restore, and build commercial property in the southeast sector.  Much of the area was a shabby urban neighborhood. In an effort to attract tenants Friedman began calling the area "River North". Within a few years, Friedman found photographers, ad agencies, and art galleries willing to rent the low-cost space and to coalesce into what is now the River North Gallery District, which has the largest concentration of art galleries in the United States outside of Manhattan. Along with hundreds of art galleries, the area has many taverns, rooftop bars, dance clubs, popular restaurants, and entertainment venues. Between the years 2000 and 2010, the population in the four census tracts covering River North increased by an average of nearly 82%, boosting population from 9,835 in 2000 to 17,892 in 2010.

Districts of River North include:
 the gallery district, primarily along Superior and Huron streets between Wells and Orleans;
 a theme-restaurant area with many tourist-oriented restaurants, surrounding Clark and Ontario;
 the cathedral district, an area with many new skyscrapers surrounding Holy Name Cathedral (Catholic) and St. James Cathedral (Episcopal), which are located near State and Superior, and Huron and Wabash, respectively. The Moody Bible Institute isn't located too far away at Chicago Avenue and LaSalle Drive;
 a design district, with shops and showrooms selling commercial and luxury interior furnishings, in the blocks north of the Merchandise Mart;
 and Kingsbury Park, an area of newly built residential high-rises surrounding Montgomery Ward Park, at Erie Street and the Chicago River.

River North is serviced by four CTA "L" train stations: the subway stations of Chicago Avenue (Red Line) and Grand Avenue (Red Line); and the elevated stations of Chicago Avenue (Brown Line) and Merchandise Mart (Brown Line).

Streeterville

Streeterville is the easternmost neighborhood in Chicago north of the Chicago River. It is bounded by the river on the south, Michigan Avenue on the west, and Lake Michigan on the north and east.

Streeterville houses some of Chicago's tallest skyscrapers (such as the John Hancock Center); many upscale stores, hotels, restaurants; and Northwestern University's Northwestern Memorial Hospital, Feinberg School of Medicine, School of Professional Studies, Kellogg School of Management's downtown campus, and School of Law.

The number one tourist attraction in the Midwest, Navy Pier, is located in Streeterville. The neighborhood also houses the Museum of Contemporary Art, Chicago.

Magnificent Mile

The Magnificent Mile is a stretch of North Michigan Avenue between the Chicago River and Oak Street. Along this portion of Michigan Avenue is a mixture of luxury stores, restaurants, office buildings, and hotels. The area has a high concentration of the city's major media firms and advertising agencies as well, including the Chicago Tribune newspaper.

The street is the home of Chicago's famous Water Tower landmark, Water Tower Park with its historic clock, and the eight-level Water Tower Place shopping center which grew up next door to the landmark. North of the shopping center can be found the famous John Hancock Center, also known as 875 North Michigan Avenue tower; the Art Deco Palmolive Building; and the lavish Drake Hotel that sits across from a beach.

Attractions

Architecture/Buildings
 Chicago Water Tower
 John Hancock Center
 Water Tower Place
 900 North Michigan
 Marina City

 
 Holy Name Cathedral
 St. James Cathedral
 Tribune Tower
 Trump Tower
 Lake Point Tower

Museums
 Chicago Children's Museum
 Driehaus Museum
 International Museum of Surgical Science
 Loyola University Museum of Art
 Museum of Contemporary Art, Chicago

Sights/Shopping
 Magnificent Mile
 Navy Pier
 Centennial Fountain
 Chicago River boat cruises

Theatre
 Chicago Shakespeare Theater
 IO Theater
 Lookingglass Theatre Company
 The Second City

Economy

Google's Chicago offices are in the Dearborn Plaza building. Etihad Airways and Qatar Airways have offices in the John Hancock Center. The Wrigley Company had its headquarters in the Wrigley Building before moving to Goose Island, also within the community area, in 2012.

After American Airlines acquired Simmons Airlines, and before Simmons was dissolved, Simmons had its headquarters on the Near North Side. At one point Indigo Airlines was headquartered on the Near North Side. The Tribune Company had its headquarters in the eponymous Tribune Tower before moving to One Prudential Plaza in the Loop in 2017. Potbelly Sandwich Works likewise was located in the Merchandise Mart complex before moving to the West Loop in 2015.

Politics

Local
The Near North Side is currently part of the 2nd, 27th, 42nd, and 43rd wards of the Chicago City Council, which are respectively represented by Democratic aldermen Brian Hopkins, Walter Burnett Jr., Brendan Reilly, and Michele Smith.

In the Cook County Board of Commissioners the majority of the area is in the 3rd district, represented by Democrat Bill Lowry. The westernmost part, including the majority of Goose Island, and much of the southwestern part, including the majority of River North, is in the 12th District, represented by Democrat John Fritchey. Two parts of the area in the extreme south—the respective vicinities of Wolf Point and the Wabash Avenue Bridge—are part of the 2nd District, represented by Democrat Dennis Deer.

State
In the Illinois House of Representatives the community area is roughly evenly split lengthwise between, from east to west, Districts 26, 5, 9, and 10, represented respectively by Democrats Christian Mitchell, Juliana Stratton, Art Turner, and Melissa Conyears. The southwest portion of the area—the western half of River North—is within District 6 represented by Democrat Sonya Harper, and the northeastern part—the eastern half of Old Town and the northern half of the Gold Coast—is within District 12, represented by Democrat Sara Feigenholtz.

In the Illinois Senate the biggest portion of the community area is in District 3, represented by Democrat Mattie Hunter, while Streeterville and the southern half of the Gold Coast is in District 13, represented by Democrat Kwame Raoul, Cabrini–Green, Goose Island, and the western half of Old Town is in District 5, represented by Democrat Patricia Van Pelt, and the eastern part of Old Town and the northern half of the Gold Coast is in District 6, represented by Democrat and Illinois Senate President John Cullerton.

Federal
In the US House of Representatives, the area is mostly within Illinois's 7th congressional district, which is the most Democratic-leaning district in the State of Illinois according to the Cook Partisan Voting Index with a score of D+38 and represented by Democrat Danny K. Davis. Small parts in the north are within Illinois's 5th congressional district, which is represented by Democrat Mike Quigley.

The Near North Side community area has supported the Democratic Party in the past two presidential elections. In the 2016 presidential election, the Near North Side cast 32,150 votes for Hillary Clinton and cast 8,778 votes for Donald Trump (74.5% to 20.4%). In the 2012 presidential election, the Near North Side cast 24,592 votes for Barack Obama and cast 12,939 votes for Mitt Romney (64.5% to 34.0%).

Diplomatic missions
Several consulates are located on the Near North Side. The main building and visa office of the Consulate-General of the People's Republic of China are here. Other countries with missions here include Austria, Bosnia and Herzegovina, Brazil, Bulgaria, Chile, Colombia, Denmark, Egypt, Germany, Greece, India, Republic of Ireland, Italy, Japan, South Korea, Lithuania, Poland, Serbia, Switzerland, Thailand, the United Kingdom, and Ukraine.

Three trade missions have offices at 500 North Michigan Avenue: the Austrian Trade Commission is located in Suite 1950, the Italian-American Chamber of Commerce Midwest is located in Suite 506, and the Trade Commission of Spain is here.

Education

Colleges and universities
Northwestern University School of Law
Northwestern University Medical School
Loyola University Chicago School of Law
Loyola University Chicago Graduate School of Business, School of Social Work, Institute of Pastoral Studies, School of Continuing and Professional Studies, and School of Communication
The Chicago School of Professional Psychology
University of Chicago's Booth School of Business Gleacher Center
Erikson Institute
Moody Bible Institute

Primary and secondary schools
Chicago Public Schools serves residents of the Near North Side.
Zoned elementary schools include Ogden International School (Jenner School has merged into Ogden)
Some students are zoned to Wells Community Academy High School while others are zoned to Lincoln Park High School

Magnet schools:
Walter Payton College Prep

Charter schools:
Noble Academy

Private schools:
Latin School of Chicago

Adult education
Feltre School

Libraries

Newberry Library

Chicago Public Library Near North Branch

Chicago Public Library Water Works Branch

Notable residents
 Conor Allen, AHL player with the Rochester Americans. He was raised in Old Town.
 Henry A. Courtney Jr. (1916–1945), officer of the United States Marine Corps Reserve and a posthumous recipient of the Medal of Honor. He resided at 30 West Chicago Avenue while studying at Loyola University's School of Law.
 Mitch Glasser (born 1989), Israeli-American baseball player
 Nellie Grant (1855–1922), daughter of President Ulysses S. Grant. At the time of her death, she resided at 1130 North Lake Shore Drive with her husband Frank Hatch Jones.
 Dwight H. Green (1897–1958), 30th Governor of Illinois (1941–1949). He resided at 1360 North Lake Shore Drive at the time of his death.
 Robert Halperin (1908–1985), athlete and businessman who founded Lands' End. He resided on the Near North Side.
 Suzanne Le Mignot, television news anchor and reporter.
 Polo G (born 1999), rapper.
 Gene Siskel (1946–1999), film critic. He resided at 1301 N. Astor St.

References

External links

Official City of Chicago Near North Side Community Map
Streeterville Chamber of Commerce
Downtown Chicago's Comprehensive Website
Gold Coast Neighbors Association
Interactive map of Near North Side
Chicago Park District:
Connors Park
Washington Square Park
Navy Pier
Travel Essay on River North by Max Grinnell
La Clark neighborhood and Young Lords origins

Beaches of Cook County, Illinois
Central Chicago
Community areas of Chicago
Entertainment districts in the United States